Ilya Sergeyevich Vaganov (born 15 January 1989) is a Russian football player.

Club career
He made his debut in the Russian Second Division for FC Rus Saint Petersburg on 15 July 2013 in a game against FC Spartak Kostroma.

References

External links
 
 
 

1989 births
Footballers from Saint Petersburg
Living people
Russian footballers
Association football defenders
Russian expatriate footballers
Expatriate footballers in Finland
FF Jaro players
Veikkausliiga players
FC Dynamo Bryansk players
Jakobstads BK players
FC Khimki players
FC Chernomorets Novorossiysk players